Lion City Sailors Football Club, commonly referred to as The Sailors or LCS, is a Singaporean professional football club competing in the Singapore Premier League, the top tier of the Singapore football league system. Since the 2021 season, the team have played their home games at Jalan Besar Stadium.

LCS is one of the most successful football clubs in Singapore, with its club owner being Forrest Li, who also owns Sea Ltd.
 
In 2021, the club smashed the league transfer history with a record S$3 million signing of Diego Lopes.

History
The Police Sports Association was founded in 1945 to organize football activities for the Singapore Police Force. It sent two teams to compete in the Singapore Amateur Football Association League in the 1950s and 1960s, but neither team won any trophies. Under coach Choo Seng Quee, Police SA won the inaugural President's Cup in 1968, then reached and lost the next two finals.

When the S.League was formed in 1996, the club was known as the Police Football Club. The following year, its name was changed to Home United to reflect the fact that the team represented not only the Singapore Police Force, but also other HomeTeam departments of the Singapore Ministry of Home Affairs such as the Singapore Civil Defence Force and the Immigration and Checkpoints Authority.

Home United was two-time S.League winners and holders of a record six Singapore Cup trophies. It was the first club to achieve the S.League and Singapore Cup double in 2003.

The team's nickname was the "Protectors"; its mascot, a dragon; its home ground, the Bishan Stadium.

On 14 February 2020, the club was privatised for the first time in its history, when Singaporean billionaire Forrest Li announced that he had purchased a 100% stake in the club. Home United Football Club was officially renamed as Lion City Sailors Football Club and its signature red colour was replaced with white and blue. LCS' main aim following its rebranding was to boost professionalism in Singaporean football, with becoming a Southeast Asian super club its long-term goal. The new name, Sailors, was a homage to the country's maritime heritage.

On 21 January 2021, the club created history by smashing the Singapore Premier League transfer-fee record with the signing of midfielder Diego Lopes from Portuguese top-flight side Rio Ave for 1.8 million euros  on a three-year deal.

On 18 April 2022, the club defeated K League 1 club Daegu FC 3–0 in the 2022 AFC Champions League, their first AFC Champions League win since their rebranding.

Lion City Sailors Football Academy
In February 2013, Home United opened and operated a football academy, Home United FC Youth Football Academy (HYFA). HYFA comprises ten futsal courts, two full-size football pitches, an events plaza, staff offices, meeting rooms and a Sports Performance Centre.

In June 2020, the launch of the new Lion City Sailors Football Academy was announced, along with further plans on youth development and its investments. It was given a one-star rating by the Asian Football Confederation.

On 24 April 2021, the Lion City Sailors announced the construction of a new training facility along Mattar Road that will be home to both the Sailors and the LCS Football Academy, featuring two full-sized and three seven-a-side pitches, along with a gym, physiotherapy rooms and an analysis room. The facility was planned to be completed in April 2022. In July 2022, the training facility was officially opened.

Players

Squad

U23

U23 
 
 

U23

U23

U23
U21
U21
U21

U21
U21

On loan

U21 (to Young Lions)
U23 (National Service until 2023)
U21 (National Service until 2024)
U21 (National Service until 2024)
U21 (National Service until 2024)
U21 (National Service until 2024)
U21 (National Service until 2024)
U21 (National Service until 2024)
U21 (National Service until 2024)
U21 (National Service until 2025)
U21 (National Service until 2025, to Young Lions)

Club officials

Kit suppliers and shirt sponsors

Honours

League
 S.League: 3
 1999, 2003, 2021
 National Football League Division One: 1
 1985

Cup
 Singapore Cup: 6 (record)
 2000, 2001, 2003, 2005, 2011, 2013
  Singapore Community Shield: 2 
 2019, 2022
 President's Cup: 1
 1980
 FAS Challenge Cup: 1
 1968

Reserves
 Prime League: 8 (record)
 2001, 2002, 2003, 2004, 2009, 2014, 2016, 2017

 Singapore FA Cup: 3
 2013, 2015, 2016

Performance in AFC competitions

 AFC Champions League: 1 appearances
2001: Second round
2022: Group stage

AFC Cup: 10 appearances
2004: Semi-finals
2005: Quarter-Finals
2006: Group stage
2008: Quarter-finals
2009: Round of 16
2012: Round of 16
2014: Group stage
2017: Zonal Finalist
2018: Inter-zonal Semi-finals
2019: Group stage

Performance

Performance by coach 
The following table provides a summary of the coach appointed by the club. 
Statistics correct as of 7 Nov 2022

Performance by Competition

Singapore Premier League 
The following table provides a summary of the result by season. 
Statistics correct as of 21 Oct 2022

AFC Competition 
The following table provides a summary of the result by season. 
Statistics correct as of 21 Oct 2022

AFC clubs ranking

Sponsors

References

External links
 Lion City Sailors Academy Launch
 Official club website
 Singapore Premier League website page on Lion City Sailors FC
 

Football clubs in Singapore
Association football clubs established in 2020
Lion City Sailors FC
2020 establishments in Singapore
Singapore Premier League clubs
Police association football clubs in Singapore